Siege of Riga by the Russian Army under Tsar Alexei Mikhailovich was the main event of the Russo-Swedish War. The fortifications of Riga consisted of a wall with ditch and 5 bastions around the old town. In 1652 Swedes had started construction of a new wall with 12 bastions around suburbs, but by 1656 the work had not been completed. The Russian vanguard consisting of the Vladimir v. Vizin reiters, Daniel Krafert infantry and Iunkmann dragoons approached Riga on August 20 and threw back the Swedes under count of Pärnu, Heinrich von Thurn into the city. Von Thurn was either killed, or captured in the action. The Swedes evacuated the suburbs and withdrew to the old town. A few days later, the main army under Tsar Alexei Mikhailovich arrived on the ships on the Duna River, and laid siege to Riga. The Russian army occupied three camps, two on the east bank of the Duna in Riga's suburbs, and a Corps under Ordyn-Nashokin on the west bank of the Duna, opposite the Kobrun entrenchment.

As Russia had no full-fledged navy to intercept reinforcements coming to the Swedish garrison across the Baltic, Riga managed to hold out until October, when foreign officers commanding a small Russian flotilla defected to the other side and the Russians had to lift the siege. In the aftermath of this reverse, the Swedes recaptured much of Ingria, took the Pskov Monastery of the Caves and inflicted a heavy defeat on the Russian general Matvey Sheremetev in  battle of Walk in 1657.

The events of the siege were recorded in an engraving by Adam Perelli that was first published in 1697 in Samuel Puffendorf's work, Konung Carl X Gustafs Bragder.

References

Second Northern War
Riga (1656)
Riga (1656)
Conflicts in 1656
1656 in Europe
History of Riga
17th century in Latvia